Nicole Steinwedell (born April 2, 1981) is an American film and television actress.

She is the daughter of two Marines and the granddaughter of an Army colonel. She has three sisters and one brother. She is best known for playing Bridget "Red Cap" Sullivan in the CBS series The Unit and as Philomena "Philly" Rotchliffer in the A&E series Breakout Kings.

In 2019, Steinwedell staged a one-woman show that she wrote, "Temple Tantrum", about growing up in a Christian cult.

Filmography

References

External links
 
 

American film actresses
American television actresses
Living people
1981 births
21st-century American actresses